River Hebert is a village on the River Hebert in Cumberland County, Nova Scotia, Canada.It is approximately 25 kilometres southwest of Amherst. As of 2021 the population was 468.

The village and the river are both named after Louis Hébert, a settler from Port Royal in 1604, who navigated the river.

Until the late 20th century, coal mining was the major industry in the area, but the last mine closed in 1981.

River Hebert is home to 1442 River Hebert Royal Canadian Army Cadet Corps, founded in 1949.  River Hebert has one school that is open to students from grades pre-primary to 12, a public library, a medical centre, and it is home to Heritage Models, a tourist attraction that features scale models of local areas of interest, such as the home of Amos Peck "King" Seaman. The Village is also home to a gas station, which was burned down, but has since been replaced.

Demographics 

References

Communities in Cumberland County, Nova Scotia
Mining communities in Nova Scotia
Villages in Nova Scotia
Designated places in Nova Scotia
General Service Areas in Nova Scotia